Events from the year 1921 in China.

Incumbents
President: Xu Shichang
Premier: Jin Yunpeng (until 18 December), Yan Huiqing (from 18 to 24 December), Liang Shiyi (from 24 December)

Events
 3 March – Shipwreck of SS Hong Moh
 30 May–3 June – The Far Eastern Championship Games are held in Shanghai.
 23–31 July – 1st National Congress of the Chinese Communist Party, which leads to the establishment of the Chinese Communist Party
 8 August – Establishment of the Vicariate Apostolic of Nganhoei
 Establishment of People's Park, in Guangzhou
 Guangdong–Guangxi War

Education
 Establishment of Hebei University
 Establishment of Xiamen University
 Establishment of Beijing Chen Jing Lun High School
 Establishment of Zhixin High School, in Guangzhou

Culture
 Establishment of Creation Quarterly

Births 
 March 
 6 March – D.C. Lau (died 2010)
 Yao Guang (died 2003)
 October
 Han Peixin (died 2017)
 Cao Keqiang
 Zhao Xiu (died 1992)
 Qian Chunqi (died 2010)

Deaths 
 14 April – Imperial Noble Consort Gongsu (born 1857)
 27 October – Yan Fu (born 1854)

References

 
1920s in China
Years of the 20th century in China